Iron Junction is a city in Saint Louis County, Minnesota, United States.  The population was 86 at the 2010 census.

Saint Louis County Highway 7 and Iron Junction Road serve as main routes in the community.  State Highway 37 (MN 37) is nearby.

The name Iron Junction, as a place of residence, is seldom used today by its residents.  Those who reside in this community simply identify themselves as a resident of Iron.  The road signs posted in the community also simply read "Iron".

The city of Iron Junction is located within Clinton Township geographically but is a separate entity.

Geography

Demographics

2010 census
As of the census of 2010, there were 86 people, 45 households, and 24 families living in the city. The racial makeup of the city was 96.5% White, 1.2% from other races, and 2.3% from two or more races. Hispanic or Latino of any race were 2.3% of the population.

There were 45 households, of which 15.6% had children under the age of 18 living with them, 42.2% were married couples living together, 2.2% had a female householder with no husband present, 8.9% had a male householder with no wife present, and 46.7% were non-families. 37.8% of all households were made up of individuals, and 11.1% had someone living alone who was 65 years of age or older. The average household size was 1.91 and the average family size was 2.42.

The median age in the city was 53.5 years. 12.8% of residents were under the age of 18; 4.6% were between the ages of 18 and 24; 16.3% were from 25 to 44; 45.4% were from 45 to 64; and 20.9% were 65 years of age or older. The gender makeup of the city was 54.7% male and 45.3% female.

2000 census
As of the census of 2000, there were 93 people, 44 households, and 31 families living in the city. The racial makeup of the city was 100.00% White. 26.5% were of Norwegian, 14.7% Finnish, 13.2% German, 11.8% Swedish, 8.8% Slovene and 5.9% French Canadian ancestry.

There were 44 households, out of which 20.5% had children under the age of 18 living with them, 61.4% were married couples living together, 2.3% had a female householder with no husband present, and 29.5% were non-families. 25.0% of all households were made up of individuals, and 9.1% had someone living alone who was 65 years of age or older. The average household size was 2.11 and the average family size was 2.52.

In the city, the population was spread out, with 14.0% under the age of 18, 5.4% from 18 to 24, 26.9% from 25 to 44, 30.1% from 45 to 64, and 23.7% who were 65 years of age or older. The median age was 47 years. For every 100 females, there were 126.8 males. For every 100 females age 18 and over, there were 122.2 males.

The median income for a household in the city was $40,938, and the median income for a family was $45,625. Males had a median income of $39,375 versus $31,875 for females. The per capita income for the city was $21,751. None of the population and none of the families were below the poverty line.

References

Cities in Minnesota
Cities in St. Louis County, Minnesota